The Colossus of Barletta is a large bronze statue of a Roman emperor, nearly three times life size (5.11 meters, or about 16 feet 7 inches) in Barletta, Italy.

The statue supposedly washed up on a shore, after a Venetian ship sank returning from the Sack of Constantinople in the Fourth Crusade in 1204, but it is not impossible that the statue was sent to the West much earlier. The identity of the emperor is uncertain. According to tradition, it depicts Heraclius (reign 610–641 AD); though this is most unlikely on historical and art-historical grounds.  More likely subjects are Theodosius II (reign 402–450 AD), who may have had it erected in Ravenna in 439, Honorius (reign 393–423 AD), Valentinian I (r. 364–375), Marcian (r. 450–457), Justinian I (r. 527–565) and especially Leo I (r. 457–474), in which case it probably topped his Column of Leo, from which fragments remain in Istanbul.

It is known that a colossal statue was discovered in 1231–1232 during excavations commissioned by emperor Frederick II in Ravenna and it's possible that he had it transported to his southern Italian lands. Regardless, the first certain historical reference to the statue dates from 1309, when parts of its legs and arms were used by local Dominicans to cast bells. The missing parts were remade in the 15th century.

The statue evidently depicts an emperor, identifiable from his imperial diadem and his commanding gesture that invokes the act of delivering a speech, with his right arm raised, holding a cross, although this is a later addition when the statue was being repaired and in place of the cross there was originally a spear or a military standard. The emperor wears a cuirass over his short tunic. His cloak is draped over his left arm in a portrait convention that goes back to Augustus. In his outstretched left hand he holds a small orb, another later addition to replace a larger original orb. His diademed head wears a Gothic jewel, similar to the one worn by Aelia Eudoxia, mother of Theodosius II. The emperor's face is rigid with strong jaw and high cheekbones with short shaved beard, his eyes being directed upwards.

See also
Regisole, a now lost equestrian statue originally from Ravenna.

Further reading
 Franklin Johnson: The Colossus of Barletta. In: American Journal of Archaeology 29, 1925, pp. 20ff.
 Tomie Di Paola. The Mysterious Giant of Barletta: An Italian Folktale (Voyager Books)
Weitzmann, Kurt, ed., Age of spirituality : late antique and early Christian art, third to seventh century, no. 23, 1979, Metropolitan Museum of Art, New York, ; full text available online from The Metropolitan Museum of Art Libraries
 Bente Kiilerich, 'The Barletta Colossus Revisited: The Methodological Challenges of an Enigmatic Statue', Acta ad archaeologiam et artium historiam pertinentia XXVIII, n.s. 14, 2015, 55–72.

External links 
Late Antiquity: Imperial Image

Barletta
Buildings and structures in the Province of Barletta-Andria-Trani
Hellenistic and Roman bronzes
Outdoor sculptures in Italy
Late Roman Empire sculptures
5th-century Roman sculptures
Ancient Greek and Roman colossal statues